Frederik Nielsen and Joseph Sirianni were the defending champions, but decided not to participate.
Karol Beck and Édouard Roger-Vasselin won the title, defeating Matthias Bachinger and Frank Moser 6–1, 6–3 in the final.

Seeds

  Gong Maoxin /  Li Zhe (semifinals)
  Matthias Bachinger /  Frank Moser (final)
  Karol Beck /  Édouard Roger-Vasselin (champions)
  Jesse Levine /  Vasek Pospisil (semifinals)

Draw

Draw

References
 Main Draw

Challenger Banque Nationale de Granby
Challenger de Granby